Mohammad Kibria ( – 7 June 2011) was a Bangladeshi artist. He was awarded Ekushey Padak in 1983 and Independence Day Award in 1999 by the Government of Bangladesh.

Early life and career
Kibria graduated from the Government School of Art at the University of Calcutta in 1950. In 1951, he came to Dhaka where he started his career as an art teacher at the Nawabpur High School. Kibria moved to Dhaka in 1951 and started his career as a school teacher at Nawabpur High School. In 1954, prompted by his teacher and mentor Zainul Abedin, Kibria joined the then Government College of Arts and Crafts (now Faculty of Fine Arts, University of Dhaka) as a lecturer. In the early days of his career, however, Kibria's influence on art was shifted from the neo-Bengal School to the European masters including Pablo Picasso and Henri Matisse as well to the emerging style of art such as impressionism, post-impressionism and expressionism.

Kibria studied at the Tokyo University of the Arts from 1959 until 1962. He was exposed to the international museums where he got the chance to watch works of the modern masters and received training under world-famous contemporary abstractionists.

Death
Kibria died of old-age complications at LabAid Hospital in Dhaka on 7 June 2011 at the age of 82.

References 

1929 births
2011 deaths
People from Birbhum district
Government College of Art & Craft alumni
Bangladeshi painters
Recipients of the Ekushey Padak
Recipients of the Independence Day Award